Slobidskyi District is an urban district of the city of Kharkiv, Ukraine, named after historical eastern region of Ukraine, Sloboda Ukraine.

The district was created in 1940 as Kominternivskyi after the Kharkiv Locomotive Factory of Komintern (today Malyshev Factory. In May 2016 it was renamed to its current name to comply with decommunization laws.

Places
 Hertzena
 Kachanivka
 Horbani
 Novi Domy

Gallery

References

External links
 Official website

 
Urban districts of Kharkiv